John Martin Pitts (born February 28, 1945 in Birmingham, Alabama) is a former American football defensive back. He played in the American Football League for the Buffalo Bills and in the National Football League for the Buffalo Bills, the Denver Broncos, and the Cleveland Browns.  He played college football at Arizona State University. In 2006, he was inducted into the Santa Ana Dons Hall of Fame.

References

External links
NFL.com player page

1945 births
Living people
Players of American football from Birmingham, Alabama
American football defensive backs
Arizona State Sun Devils football players
Buffalo Bills players
Denver Broncos players
Cleveland Browns players
Santa Ana Dons football players
American Football League players